The 1928 Arkansas Razorbacks football team represented the University of Arkansas in the Southwest Conference (SWC) during the 1928 college football season. In their seventh and final year under head coach Francis Schmidt, the Razorbacks compiled a 7–2 record (2–1 against SWC opponents), finished in second place in the SWC, shut out five of their nine opponents, and outscored all opponents by a combined total of 251 to 63.

Schedule

References

Arkansas
Arkansas Razorbacks football seasons
Arkansas Razorbacks football